William Alfred Chambers (born 16 September 1900) was an English footballer who played in the Football League for Rotherham County.

References

1900 births
Year of death missing
English footballers
Association football defenders
English Football League players
Mexborough Athletic F.C. players
Rotherham County F.C. players
Denaby United F.C. players